Theo Eltink (born November 27, 1981, in Eindhoven) is a Dutch former professional road bicycle racer.

Biography
In his youth, Eltink also was a good ice skater, but finally chose for cycling. He competed in cyclo-cross and road races at cycling club "Het snelle wiel". After Eltink finished school, he focussed on cycling.

Eltink became a member of the Rabobank TT3, a team for promising young riders. In his first year, Eltink started in the 2005 Giro d'Italia, and finished 29th in the general classification.

Major results

 Tour de l'Avenir - 1 stage (2004)
 Tour des Pyrénées - 1 stage (2004)
 2nd, National U23 Cyclo-Cross Championship (2003)
 3rd, National U17 Cyclo-Cross Championship (1997)

External links 
Profile at Rabobank official website

1981 births
Living people
Dutch male cyclists
Sportspeople from Eindhoven
Cyclists from North Brabant
20th-century Dutch people
21st-century Dutch people